Fred Turnbull (born 28 August 1946) is an English former professional footballer who played as a defender for Aston Villa from 1966 to 1974. He had a twin brother who loved football also and an older sister.

Playing career
Turnbull started his career at First Division Aston Villa in September 1966.

Despite the club's decline, Villa managed to reach the final of the League Cup in 1971. Turnbull was in the first eleven for the Wembley final played in front of 100,000 spectators; Villa lost out 2–0 to Tottenham Hotspur after two late goals from Martin Chivers. The "Villans" built on their cup run however, and were promoted in 1971–72 after finishing top of the Third Division. Turnbull was forced to retire due to injury in 1974, after 183 appearances and 3 goals for Aston Villa in all competitions.

References

1946 births
Living people
Sportspeople from Wallsend
Footballers from Tyne and Wear
English footballers
Association football central defenders
Aston Villa F.C. players
Halifax Town A.F.C. players
English Football League players